Sitthikom Thammasin (born 7 April 1995) is a Thai badminton player. He won the men's singles title at the 2012 Singapore International Series when he was 17. Thammasin was part of the Thailand national team that clinched the bronze medal at the 2019 Sudirman Cup. His best achievement in the individual event was becoming the champion at the BWF World Tour Super 300 2019 Macau Open.

Achievements

Southeast Asian Games 
Men's singles

Asian Junior Championships 
Boys' singles

BWF World Tour (2 titles) 
The BWF World Tour, which was announced on 19 March 2017 and implemented in 2018, is a series of elite badminton tournaments sanctioned by the Badminton World Federation (BWF). The BWF World Tours are divided into levels of World Tour Finals, Super 1000, Super 750, Super 500, Super 300 (part of the HSBC World Tour), and the BWF Tour Super 100.

Men's singles

BWF International Challenge/Series (3 titles, 1 runner-up) 
Men's singles

  BWF International Challenge tournament
  BWF International Series tournament
  BWF Future Series tournament

References

External links 
 

Living people
1995 births
Sitthikom Thammasin
Sitthikom Thammasin
Badminton players at the 2014 Asian Games
Sitthikom Thammasin
Competitors at the 2019 Southeast Asian Games
Competitors at the 2021 Southeast Asian Games
Sitthikom Thammasin
Sitthikom Thammasin
Southeast Asian Games medalists in badminton
Sitthikom Thammasin